Zoe, Zoey, Zoie, Zoé or Zoë (Greek: ζωή) is a female first name of Greek origin, meaning "life". It is a currently popular name for girls in many countries. It has ranked among the top 100 names for girls born in the United States since 2000. It is also well used in other English-speaking countries including Australia, Canada, Ireland, New Zealand, and the United Kingdom, as well as in other countries including Belgium, Czech Republic, France, Hungary, Italy, Mexico, Netherlands, Spain, and Switzerland.

Zoe is also a surname. Notable people and characters with the name include:

People

Mythology
Zoe, the daughter of King Midas

Historical
Zoë Porphyrogenita, Byzantine empress
Exuperius and Zoe, saints, martyrs (died 127)
Zoe of Rome (died ), martyred saint
Zoe Karbonopsina (died ), Byzantine empress
Zoe Palaiologina (c. 1455–1503), wife of Tsar Ivan III of Russia
Zoé Talon, comtesse du Cayla (1785–1852), intimate friend and confidante of Louis XVIII

Contemporary

Arts and entertainment
 Gorilla Zoe, American rapper
Zoë (Austrian singer) (Zoë Straub) (born 1996), Austrian singer, songwriter, and actress
Zoë (British singer) (Zoë Pollock; born 1969), English pop star
Zoe Akins (1886–1958), Pulitzer Prize-winning playwright, poet and author
Zoë Avril (born 1980), French singer
Zoë Baird (born 1952), American lawyer, Attorney General nominee in 1993
Zoë Ball (born 1970), English television and radio personality
Zoë Bell (born 1978), New Zealand stuntwoman and actress
Zoe Beloff (born 1958), New York-based artist 
Zoe Bertram, Australian actress
Zoe Birkett (born 1985), English singer
Zoe Boyle (born 1989), English actress
Zoe Caldwell (1933–2020), Australian actress
Zoe Cassavetes (born 1970), American director, screenwriter and actress
Zoë Chao (born 1985), American actress and screenwriter
Zoe Colletti (born 2001), American actress
Zooey Deschanel (born 1980), American actress and musician 
Zoey Deutch (born 1994), American actress and producer
Zoé Félix (born 1976), French actress
Zoë Heller (born 1965), English journalist and novelist
Zoe Kazan (born 1983), American actress
Zoë Keating (born 1972), Canadian-American cellist and composer
Zoë Kravitz (born 1988), American actress, singer and model
Zoe Laskari (1942–2017), Greek actress
Zoë Lister (born 1982), English actress
Zöe Lucker (born 1974), English actress
Zoë Lund (1962-1999), American entertainer
Zoe Lyons (born 1971), British comedian
Zoe McLellan (born 1974), American actress
Zoë Nathenson (born 1969), British actress
Zoe Naylor (born 1977), Australian actress
Zoie Palmer (born 1977), Canadian actress
Zoë Pastelle (born 1999), Swiss actress
Zoe Kincaid Penlington (1878–1944), Canadian-American expert on kabuki
Zoë Poledouris (born 1973), American actress and film composer
Zoe Saldaña (born 1978), American actress
Zoë Salmon (born 1980), Northern Irish television presenter
Zoë Straub (born 1996), Austrian singer, songwriter, and actress
Zoe Strauss (born 1970), American photographer
Zoe Sugg (born 1990), English beauty blogger and vlogger
Zoë Tapper (born 1981), English actress
Zoe Tay (born 1968), Singaporean actress
Zoé Valdés (born 1959), Cuban writer
Zoe Ventoura (born 1981), Australian actress
Zoe Verbiceanu (1893–1975), Romanian playwright and translator
Zoe Viccaji (born 1983), Pakistani singer
Zoë Wanamaker (born 1949), American-born English actress
Zoe Wees (born 2002), German singer
Zoe Wiseman (born 1970), American photographer and model

Sports
Zoé Allaire-Bourgie (born 2004), Canadian artistic gymnast
Zoé Blanc (born 1988), French ice dancer
Zoi Dimoschaki (born 1985), Greek freestyle swimmer
Zoe Goss (born 1968), Australian cricket player
Zoey Clark (born 1994), British sprinter
Zoi Paraskevopoulou, Greek archer
Zoi Sadowski-Synnott (born 2001), New Zealand snowboarder
Zoe Tynan (1998–2016), English footballer

Others
Zoe Adjonyoh, British writer and cook
Zoe Cameron, British politician
Zoe G. Cardon, American ecosystems ecologist 
Zoe Daniel, Australian journalist
Zoé de Gamond (1806–1854), Belgian educator and feminist
Zoe Dumitrescu-Bușulenga (1920–2006), Romanian literary historian
, Belgian politician (Ecolo)
Zoe Hauptová (1929–2012), Czech slavicist and chief editor of the Old Church Slavonic Dictionary
Zoé Jiménez Corretjer, award-winning author from Puerto Rico
Zoe Konstantopoulou (born 1976), Greek politician
Zoe Labouré, birth name of French saint Catherine Labouré (1806–1876)
Zoé Laurier (1842–1921), the wife of Sir Wilfrid Laurier, the seventh Prime Minister of Canada
Zoé Oldenbourg (1916–2002), Russian-born French historian and novelist
Zoe Rosenberg, American animal rights activist and animal sanctuary founder
Zoë Wicomb (born 1948), South African-Scottish author and academic
Zoé Valdés (born 1959), Cuban writer
Zoey Zane (aka Emily Sander; 1989–2007), murder victim

Surname
 John Zoe, Tli Cho statesman
 Rachel Zoe, American fashion designer

Fictional characters
Zoe, main character played by Jennifer Lopez in The Back-up Plan
Zoe, from the film Chernobyl Diaries
Zoe, the Aspect of Twilight, from the online video game League of Legends 
Zoey, one of the four Survivors in Left 4 Dead
Zoé, a character who must be rescued in the game Little Big Adventure
Zoë, in the series Monarch of the Glen
Zoe, character in, and the subject of, the play The Octoroon
Zoey, a little girl character in the 2019 comedy movie Playing with Fire
Zoey, Dawn's rival in the Pokémon anime
Zoey, Rudolph's love interest in Rudolph the Red-Nosed Reindeer: The Movie
Zoe, a Muppet character on Sesame Street
Zoey, in Total Drama: Revenge of the Island, the fourth season of the Total Drama series
Zoey, the main character from Netflix's StarBeam
Zoe, from Zombeavers
Zoey, from the video game Yo-kai Watch (originally named Shizuka Sakai)
Zoe Aves, from El Tigre:The Adventures of Manny Rivera
Zoe Baker, in the television series This Is Us
Zoe Barnes, newspaper reporter/blogger, House of Cards
Zoey Bartlet, youngest daughter of President Barlet on the TV series The West Wing
Zoë Bean, a rational character in the webcomic Sluggy Freelance
Zoe Belmont, from Castlevania
Zoe Benson, a young witch enrolled in the Academy for Exceptional Young Ladies, American Horror Story: Coven
Zoë Boutin Perry, protagonist and narrator of John Scalzi's novel Zoe's Tale
Zoey Brooks, main character on Zoey 101
Zoe Busiek, protagonist to the drama Wild Card
Zoe Carpenter, from British soap opera Hollyoaks
Zoe Carter, from the TV show Eureka
Zoë Castillo, the primary protagonist of a computer game Dreamfall: The Longest Journey
Zoey Davis, from the 2019 film Escape Room
Zoey Franklin, from the Dork Diaries book series
Zoe Hamilton, from The Perfect Man
Zoë Hange, or Hange Zoë, from the anime series Attack on Titan
Zoey Hanson, Ichigo Momomiya's English dub name in Tokyo Mew Mew (Mew Mew Power)
Zoe Hart, in the U.S. TV series Hart of Dixie, played by Rachel Bilson
Zoe Heriot, companion of the Second Doctor from Doctor Who
Zoe Landau, ex-wife of lead character Cal Lightman on television series Lie to Me
Zoe Lawton, the daughter of comic book character Deadshot
Zoé Lee, a character from the animated TV show Miraculous: Tales of Ladybug & Cat Noir
Zoey Lou, an alias adopted by a character in Missing You
Zoe Louise, the protagonist of the books Zoe Rising and Stonewords by author Pam Conrad
Zoe Luper, from the soap opera All My Children
Zoe MacPherson, from the Baby Blues comic strip and TV adaption
Zoe Murphy, from the musical Dear Evan Hansen
Zoe Newton, from soap opera EastEnders
Zoë Nightshade, from the Percy Jackson & the Olympians book series
Zoe Orimoto (Izumi Orimoto in Japanese version), from Digimon Frontier
Zoe Payne, from the game SSX
Zoey Pierson, Ted's environmentalist girlfriend in How I Met Your Mother
Zoey Redbird, the protagonist of the House of Night novels
Zoe Reynolds, from Spooks (MI-5 in the USA)
Zoe Rivas, from the teen drama Degrassi
Zoe Ramos, a character from the Ghost Whisperer
Zoe Slater, main character from soap opera EastEnders
Zoe Trent, from Littlest Pet Shop
Zoe Tripp, a folk singer from the 2005 film The Californians
Zoe Washburne, from the Firefly TV series
Zoey Woodbine, from the sitcom Cybill
Zoe Young, from the animated series Fantastic Max
Zoe Zibbell, in the book series Spy School by Stuart Gibbs

See also
Zoe (disambiguation)
Zoya (disambiguation)
Zoia

References

Greek feminine given names
Given names of Greek language origin
English feminine given names